Emporium is a luxury shopping mall in Khlong Toei District, Bangkok, Thailand. It opened in 1997. It is owned and operated by The Mall Group, who also operate the EmQuartier and Siam Paragon malls in Bangkok.

It is on Sukhumvit Road at Sukhumvit Soi 24 beside Benchasiri Park. It is connected directly to the Phrom Phong Station on the Sukhumvit Line of the BTS Skytrain by a footbridge. 

Emporium is a major component of the "EM District" and contains a shopping mall, department store, a luxury cinema "Emprivé Cineclub by SF Corporation", a high-end supermarket, food court, office building, exhibition hall, children's play centres and a hotel. Emporium is a popular hub for entertainment, food, and education for local residents and visitors.

Design 
Emporium was designed by J+H Boiffils. Emporium was their first shopping mall design project in Thailand. They later designed Siam Paragon, another Bangkok shopping mall, for the same developer. Emporium was Bangkok's first luxury lifestyle mall offering venues for upscale shopping, dining, entertainment, and supermarket in one complex. With the launch of the Bangkok Skytrain system several years later, Emporium was the first mall to allow direct access from the Skytrain station.

Space allocation  
Currently, the building has two functional parts.

 Shopping complex – This part of the mall is decorated in the form of a gallery with white and gold. It consists of:
 The Emporium department store
 Sport mall global
 Power mall ultra
 Be-trend
 Gourmet Market (supermarket)
 Emporium food hall
 Warp Zone by Fun Fiesta
 EM playground
 IMAGINIA
 Foxscape
 EM Farm
 Emprivé Cineclub by SF Corporation
 AIS D.C. by TCDC and AIS

The shopping complex is linked to the EmQuartier and BTS Skytrain, Phrom Phong Station.
 Emporium Tower – A multi-purpose building 41 floors high. It consists of two parts:
 Emporium office building
 Emporium Suites By Chatrium

EM District expansion
In 2013, The Mall Group announced six new projects, including the re-announcing of the Emporium Quartier and the Emporium Sphere, and called them as The EM District. The EM District is a group of three Emporium's shopping malls including two current shopping mall and the one future project: 
 Emporium - The first shopping mall, opened in 1997
 EmQuartier - The second shopping mall, opposite Emporium. Opened in May 2015.
 EmSphere - The third branch of the District EM shopping mall group next to Benchasiri Park. The project was expected to be constructed from in 2015-7 but construction was delayed. Between 2016 and 2018, the land earmarked for Emsphere was occupied by a temporary dinosaur theme park called Dinosaur Planet.

References

External links
 https://www.emporium.co.th/
 https://www.emquartier.co.th/
 https://www.instagram.com/emporium_emquartier/

Shopping malls in Bangkok
The Mall Group
Khlong Toei district
Shopping malls established in 1997
1997 establishments in Thailand